Nikolay Kuznetsov or Nikolai Kuznetsov may refer to:

Nikolai Kuznetsov (admiral) (1904–1974), Soviet Navy admiral, Hero of the Soviet Union
Russian aircraft carrier Admiral Kuznetsov, aircraft carrier built in 1991, named after the naval officer
Nikolai Kuznetsov (artilleryist) (1922—2008) Hero of the Soviet Union and full bearer of the Order of Glory
Nikolai Kuznetsov (botanist), President of the Estonian Naturalists' Society 1905–1911
Nikolay Kuznetsov (cyclist) (born 1973), Russian cyclist, brother of Svetlana Kuznetsova
Nikolay Kuznetsov (fencer) (1882–after 1912), Russian fencer
Nikolay Kuznetsov (footballer) (born 1999), Russian football player
Nikolai Kuznetsov (pianist) (born 1994), Russian pianist
Nikolai Kuznetsov (pilot) (1922–2009), Director of the Kazakh Soviet Socialist Republic Administration of Civil Aviation
Nikolay Kuznetsov (rower) (born 1953), Soviet rower
Nikolai Kuznetsov (spy) (1911–1944), Soviet intelligence agent during World War II
Nikolay Kuznetsov (water polo) (1931–1995), Soviet water polo player
Nikolai Dmitriyevich Kuznetsov (1911–1995), Soviet jet and rocket engine designer, Hero of Socialist Labor
Nikolai Dmitriyevich Kuznetsov (painter) (1850–1930), Ukrainian-Russian painter
Nikolai Efimovich Kuznetsov (1879–1970), Russian and Soviet painter 
Nikolai Yakovlevich Kuznetsov (1873–1948), Russian entomologist, paleoentomologist and physiologist
Nikolay V. Kuznetsov (born 1979), Russian nonlinear dynamics and control theory scientist
Nicolas Kusnezov, or Nikolaj Nikolajevich Kuznetsov-Ugamsky (1898–1963), a notable myrmecologist